Pascal Thiébaut (born 5 June 1959) is a retired French athlete who competed in middle- and long-distance events. He was born in Nancy.He represented his country at the 1984 and 1988 Summer Olympics as well as two indoor and three outdoor World Championships. In addition he won the bronze medal at the 1987 European Indoor Championships.

Competition record

Personal bests
Outdoor
800 meters – 1:47.1 (St-Maur 1984)
1000 meters – 2:17.71 (Anneville 1985)
1500 meters – 3:34.08 (Monaco 1992)
One mile – 3:52.02 (Oslo 1984)
3000 meters – 7:42.64 (Villeneuve d'Ascq 1989)
5000 meters – 13:14.60 (Oslo 1987)
Indoor
1500 meters – 3:42.48 (Liévin 1987)
3000 meters – 7:47.51 (Seville 1991)

References

All-Athletics profile

1959 births
Living people
Sportspeople from Nancy, France
French male middle-distance runners
French male long-distance runners
Athletes (track and field) at the 1984 Summer Olympics
Athletes (track and field) at the 1988 Summer Olympics
Athletes (track and field) at the 1992 Summer Olympics
Olympic athletes of France
World Athletics Championships athletes for France
Athletes (track and field) at the 1983 Mediterranean Games
Athletes (track and field) at the 1993 Mediterranean Games
Mediterranean Games competitors for France
20th-century French people
21st-century French people